The Lounge Lizards were an eclectic musical group founded by saxophonist John Lurie and his brother, pianist Evan Lurie, in 1978. Initially known for their ironic, tongue-in-cheek take on jazz, The Lounge Lizards eventually became a showcase for John Lurie's sophisticated compositions straddling jazz and many other genres. They were active until about 1998 with the Lurie brothers as the only constant members, though many leading New York City based musicians were members of the group. 

The group's name was borrowed from American slang. A lounge lizard is typically depicted as a well-dressed man who frequents the establishments in which the rich gather with the intention of seducing a wealthy woman with his flattery and deceptive charm.

History
At its founding, the band consisted of John Lurie and Evan Lurie, guitarist Arto Lindsay, bassist Steve Piccolo, and percussionist Anton Fier. Though partly inspired by jazz, John Lurie said he used guitarists in the band "to foil the music when it gets too jazzlike". They released a self-titled album on EG Records in 1981 and produced by Teo Macero. The album included two Thelonious Monk covers, but as one critic noted, "the two aforementioned Monk covers seem a strange choice when you actually hear the band, which has more in common with sonic experimentalists like Ornette Coleman or Sun Ra." John Lurie later said this version of the band broke up due in part to creative tensions exacerbated by conflicts with EG Records executives, and in part due to his growing belief "that what we were doing was maybe phony".John Lurie (2021). The History of Bones, Random House

A transitional version of the band for about a year in 1982-83 featured the Lurie brothers, with bassist Tony Garnier, trombonist Peter Zummo and drummer Dougie Bowne, augmented by other musicians depending on availability (e.g., bassist Fred Hopkins substituted for Garnier during a short tour). This version of the Lounge Lizards did not record a studio album. 

By the mid-1980s, a new line-up included bassist Erik Sanko, trombonist Curtis Fowlkes, guitarist Marc Ribot, saxophonist Roy Nathanson, and percussionists Bowne and E.J. Rodriguez. This group recorded various live and studio albums and showcased John Lurie's increasingly sophisticated and multi-layered compositions. John Lurie noted their music in this era was inspired by diverse sources such as "James Brown to Balinese music, from Varèse to Coltrane".

The band's 1987 music video Big Heart was featured on the adult animation The Brothers Grunt. 

In 1998, the band released Queen of All Ears on John Lurie's Strange and Beautiful Music label and had added Steven Bernstein, Michael Blake, Oren Bloedow, David Tronzo, Calvin Weston, and Billy Martin. "The Lizards' music isn't jazz," said Fred Bouchard of JazzTimes, "but it is intelligent and rhythmically and harmonically interesting (it ain't rock either, in other words) and, despite the ultra-hip trappings, it has an almost innocent directness that can transcend stylistic prejudice."

The Lounge Lizards have been inactive since about 2000. John Lurie has been occupied with painting, while Evan has worked on The Backyardigans, a children's show that highlights multiple musical genres.

Personnel
John Lurie estimates about 80 musicians recorded or performed with the Lounge Lizards. Performers included: 
 John Lurie - alto/soprano saxophone
 Evan Lurie - piano, organ
 Arto Lindsay - guitar
 Steve Piccolo - bass
 Anton Fier - drums
 Dana Vlcek - guitar
 Danny Rosen - guitar
 Peter Zummo - trombone
 Tony Garnier - bass
 Dougie Bowne - drums
 Roy Nathanson - saxophone
 Curtis Fowlkes - trombone
 Marc Ribot - guitar, trumpet, Eb horn
 Erik Sanko - bass
 E.J. Rodriguez - percussion
 Brandon Ross - guitar
 Al MacDowell - bass
 Calvin Weston - drums
 Michael Blake - saxophone
 Steven Bernstein - trumpet
 Billy Martin - percussion
 Jane Scarpantoni - cello
 Bryan Carrott - marimba, vibes
 Michele Navazio - guitar
 Oren Bloedow - bass
 David Tronzo - guitar
 Ben Perowsky - percussion
 Tony Scherr - bass
 Doug Wieselman - guitar, clarinet
 Mauro Refosco - percussion
 John Medeski - organ
 Kenny Wollesen - drums
 Jaime Scott - guitar
 Danny Blume - guitar
 Clark Gayton - trombone

Discography

Studio albums

Live albums

References

Avant-garde jazz ensembles
Musical groups established in 1978
Musical groups disestablished in 1998
1978 establishments in New York (state)
1998 disestablishments in New York (state)
E.G. Records artists
No wave groups